Dow Sari (also Romanized as Dow Sārī, Do Sārī, and Dūsāri; also known as Ḩaşārī) is a city in Jahadabad Rural District, in the Central District of Anbarabad County, Kerman Province, Iran. At the 2006 census, its population was 5,620, in 1,028 families.

References 

Populated places in Anbarabad County
Cities in Kerman Province